Giacomo Altoviti (1604 – 18 May 1693) was a Roman Catholic prelate who served as Titular Patriarch of Antiochia (1667–1693), Apostolic Nuncio to Venice (1658–1666), and Titular Archbishop of Athenae (1658–1667).

Biography
Giacomo Altoviti was born in 1604 in Florence. His father was Lorenzo Altoviti, a rich papal banker, Florentine senator and preferred nephew of his uncle cardinal Giovanni Bonsi. His father was also the brother of Francesca Sacchetti Altoviti, mother of the late cardinal Giulio Cesare Sacchetti and Marcelo Sacchetti, papal treasurer of Urban VIII.

Giacomo Altoviti attended the Roman seminary and became a close friend to Fabio Chigi. Giacomo Altoviti followed his friend when Fabio Chigi was appointed by Urban VIII papal legate to Ferrara and in Mata, when his friend and protector was sent there in 1635 as inquisitor and apostolic visitor. He also took part in Fabio Chigi appointment to the cardinalate, using his influence with his cousin cardinal Giulio Cesare Sacchetti, who had already had the opportunity to appreciate Chigi's talents and to conceive a profound esteem for him. Later the Altoviti and Sacchetti supported Fabio Chigi in the negotiations and conclave of that led to his election as Pope Alexander VII.

Giacomo Altoviti career flourished. On 29 July 1658, he was appointed during the papacy of Pope Alexander VII as Titular Archbishop of Athenae. On 11 August 1658, he was consecrated by his cousin Giulio Cesare Sacchetti, Cardinal-Bishop of Sabina. On 21 September 1658, he was appointed during the papacy of Pope Alexander VII as Apostolic Nuncio to Venice. He resigned as Apostolic Nuncio to Venice on 22 April 1666. On 18 April 1667, he was appointed during the papacy of Pope Alexander VII as Titular Patriarch of Antiochia.

He served as Titular Patriarch of Antiochia until his death on 18 May 1693.

Episcopal succession

References

External links and additional sources
 (for Chronology of Bishops) 
 (for Chronology of Bishops) 
 (for Chronology of Bishops)  

17th-century Roman Catholic titular bishops
Bishops appointed by Pope Alexander VII
1604 births
1693 deaths
Apostolic Nuncios to the Republic of Venice